Children's literature periodicals include magazines about children's literature intended for adults, such as:

 Academic journals focusing on the scholarly study of children's and young adult literature
 Review journals reviewing specific works for children and young adults
 Library science and education journals discussing the selection and use of literature with children

Children's magazines, which are magazines intended for children, are not included in this category.

Academic journals
 ALAN Review
 Bookbird: A Journal of International Children's Literature
 The Bulletin of the Center for Children's Books
 Children's Literature
 Children's Literature Association Quarterly
 The Lion and the Unicorn

Review journals
 The Horn Book Magazine
 School Library Journal

The general purpose review journals Kirkus Reviews and Publishers Weekly also have established sections for reviewing children's and young adult books.

Library science journals
 Young Adult Library Services

Education journals
 Book Links
 English Journal

Periodicals
Literary magazines